The 1919 Georgia Bulldogs football team Georgia Bulldogs of the University of Georgia during the 1919 college football season. completed the season with a 4–2–3 record.  The Bulldogs won their first four games, but struggled in the last five games.  The two losses came against Alabama and Auburn.   This was Coach Cunningham's last season as the head coach for Georgia.  The record for the decade was the same as the coach's record: 43–18–9.

Before the season
Georgia had its first season since the First World War interrupted play.

Schedule

Season summary

Sewanee
Sewanee was defeated 13–0. The starting lineup was Reynolds (left end), Rigdon (left tackle), Whelchel (left guard), Day (center), Vandiver (right guard), Pew (right tackle), Hargrett (right end), Barchan (quarterback), J. Reynolds (left halfback(Rothe (right halfback), Neville (fullback).

Florida

Sources:

Florida's Tootie Perry had a breakout game in a 16–0 win for the Bulldogs on Plant Field, dueling with Georgia center Bum Day. The Gators kept the game close for three quarters.

The starting lineup was Collings (left end), Pew (left tackle), Vandiver (left guard), Day (center), Whelchel (right guard), Rigdon (right tackle), O. Reynolds (right end), Barchan (quarterback), Rothe (left halfback), Cheves (right halfback), Munn (fullback).

Auburn

Sources:

In heavy rain and mud, SIAA champion Auburn defeated Georgia 7–0. Red Howard ran through the entire Georgia team for 52 yards and the touchdown.

The starting lineup was O. Reynolds (left end), Harper (left tackle), Vandiver (left guard), Day (center), Pew (right guard), Rigdon (right tackle), Collings (right end), Barchan (quarterback), J. Reynolds (left halfback), Rothe (right halfback), Neville (fullback).

Tulane

Georgia and Tulane fought to a 7–7 tie. The starting lineup was Reynolds (left end), Harper (left tackle), Whelchel (left guard), Day (center), Rigdon (right guard), Pew (right tackle), Collings (right end), Barchan (quarterback), McWhorter (left halfback(Broyles (right halfback), Munn (fullback).

Alabama

Sources:

Alabama beat the Bulldogs 6–0. The only points in the game came on a pair of J. T. O'Connor field goals. The first was from 45-yards in the first and the second from 25-yards in the second quarter. Both teams played strong defense throughout the game, and Georgia nearly pulled out a win when Buck Cheves intercepted an Alabama pass in the final seconds of the game and made a sizable return before he was tackled by the Crimson Tide.

The starting lineup was Reynolds (left end), Harper (left tackle), Rigdon (left guard), Day (center), Whelchel (right guard), Pew (right tackle), Collings (right end), Cheeves (quarterback), McWhorter (left halfback(Broyles (right halfback), Tanner (fullback).

Clemson
The Bulldogs and the Clemson Tigers battled to a scoreless tie.

References

Bibliography
 

Georgia
Georgia Bulldogs football seasons
Georgia Bulldogs football